Sol Lesser (February 17, 1890 – September 19, 1980) was an American film producer. He received a star on the Hollywood Walk of Fame in 1960 and was awarded the Jean Hersholt Humanitarian Award in 1961.

Biography
In 1913, while living in San Francisco, Sol Lesser learned that the authorities were about to clean out the Barbary Coast district, a raucous area of gambling houses, saloons and brothels. He grabbed a camera and a friend, future Hollywood cameraman Hal Mohr, and roamed the area, especially the parts that were best-known before the area was shut down. (The Barbary Coast was not actually closed down until 1917.) This film is now considered a lost film.

The resulting film was The Last Night of the Barbary Coast, an early example of an exploitation film that was sold directly to movie theater owners by Lesser. With the profits from the film, he bought several theaters, and soon owned a cinema chain.

Sol Lesser signed Jackie Coogan to a movie contract in 1922, establishing both as major Hollywood names. The Coogan-Lesser hits included Oliver Twist and Peck's Bad Boy. Lesser made a successful transition to sound films, with his own Principal Pictures company; he would either distribute his productions himself under the Principal name, or arrange for a major studio to release them under their own trademarks. In 1933, Lesser produced Thunder Over Mexico a compilation film made from Eisenstein's Que Viva Mexico! with the permission of Upton Sinclair, who had commissioned the Soviet film maker, and his wife.

His productions usually had higher budgets than the usual independent features; Lesser was able to produce entire series with name stars like Bela Lugosi, George O'Brien, and Bobby Breen.

In 1933 Lesser succeeded in buying screen rights to Edgar Rice Burroughs' Tarzan character. A Tarzan the Fearless serial with screen newcomer Buster Crabbe resulted, but Burroughs, deciding to make his own Tarzan films, refused to renegotiate with Lesser. Burroughs's movie enterprises were short-lived, and the rights passed to Metro-Goldwyn-Mayer. Burroughs sold Lesser options on all his Tarzan novels for seven years with Lesser producing one Tarzan film a year for 20th Century Fox. Only one Tarzan film Tarzan's Revenge featuring athletes Glenn Morris and Eleanor Holm was produced; Lesser sold the rights back to MGM. He returned to the Tarzan property in 1943, after MGM relinquished the rights. Lesser's new Tarzan films were produced for RKO and starred Johnny Weissmuller and later Lex Barker and Gordon Scott, and Lesser devoted himself to these jungle adventures for the rest of his career.

Later films include Our Town (1940) and the all-star wartime revue Stage Door Canteen (1943) that featured a cameo by Johnny Weissmuller. Toward the end of his life he was actively involved in restoring many of his early productions.

Lesser retired in 1958, selling the Tarzan rights to producer Sy Weintraub. "I had reached the age that one either finishes on top or far below. I decided I would end on top, and I was satisfied," he said.

Lesser was buried at Hillside Memorial Park in Culver City, California.

Accolades
Sol Lesser was the recipient of The Jean Hersholt Humanitarian Award in 1960. He has a star on the Hollywood Walk of Fame.

Filmography

References

External links

 
 
 

1890 births
1980 deaths
20th-century American businesspeople
Burials at Hillside Memorial Park Cemetery
Businesspeople from Spokane, Washington
Film producers from Washington (state)
Jean Hersholt Humanitarian Award winners